Cupeta or copeta (originating from Arabic "qubbayt", literally meaning preserved sweet) is a dessert made from honey, dissolved sugar and diced almonds.

Cupeta is usually consumed during the Christmas period in the Italian regions of Calabria, Campania, Apulia, and Sicily, as well as in Ponente Ligure where on the other hand it is prepared all-year-long.

Preparation method 

Cupeta is made from a liquified mixture of almonds, honey and sugar; which is then either left to solidify or consumed in a semi-liquid form. The specific recipe, which may include additional ingredients, varies from region to region and may present differences depending family traditions.

The preparation method is similar to the one used for giurgiulena, which however differs in the addition of sesame seeds.

Cupeta was awarded the recognition of being a Prodotto agroalimentare tradizionale calabrese, campano and pugliese (Traditional product of Calabria, Campania and Apulia).

Variants 
In Campania copeta is produced in the provinces of Avellino, Benevento and Salerno and is considered a white, compact, torrone flavoured with hazelnuts, almonds and pistachios.

In the province of Rieti (Latium) and in the region of Abruzzo, copeta is prepared with honey and diced walnuts, and is usually soft and in the shape of a square rather than being crunchy and rectangular; it is usually served on laurus nobilis leaves used as a container and preserver.

History 
The word Cupeta is of Latin or Arabic origins. The first explicit record of its existence in Italy dates back to 1287.

The dessert was part of the wedding feast of Bona Sforza and Sigismund I the Old in 1517.

Etymology 

Several sources (including official Italian ministerial ones), state that the name comes from the latin word cupedia, however, this is an incorrect etymological attribution made by Matteo Camera in1838. The similar latin terms cupedia and copadia respectively mean "sweat treats" and "meat pieces".

The name 'cupeta' on the other hand comes from the arabic word qubbayt, literally meaning "sweet preserve", and was documented for the first time in a document from Palermo of 1287, where a cubaydario cited (a producer of cubaita, a dessert made of apples, almonds, toasted cheakpeas and sesami seeds).

The name is then mentioned by Giambattista Basile (Naples 600s) twice, in the Lo cunto de li cunti overo lo trattamento de peccerille and in the Le cinco figlie, as well as by Giulio Cesare Cortese in the Micco Passaro nnammorato.

See also 
 Croccante
 Torrone
 Giurgiulena
 List of Italian desserts and pastries

References

Bibliography 

 Pitaro Francesco, La copéta, l'antico dolce natalizio calabrese, Grafiche Lucia, 2008
 Sebastiano Rizza,Cupeta: storia di un dolce enigma, https://web.archive.org/web/20160313115903/http://digilander.libero.it/cultura.popolare/pignola/parole/cupeta.html

External links 

  Wikimedia Commons contiene immagini o altri file su Cupeta
 
 
 Cupeta su nelSalento.com

Almond desserts
Cuisine of Calabria
Cuisine of Apulia
Christmas food